The men's 4 x 400 metres relay at the 2009 World Championships in Athletics was held at the Olympic Stadium on August 22 and August 23.

Britain's Conrad Williams looked to be leading the stagger on the first leg, but a late rush by Arismendy Peguero had the Dominican Republic making the handoff even, while USA put hurdler Angelo Taylor on the first leg, so they started with a slight deficit.  Jeremy Wariner had won the previous two world championships in the open 400 metres, but lost his title a few days earlier.  He had something to prove, flying through the turn, Wariner put the USA into the lead by the break.  After he passed Yon Soriano on the inside, Soriano accelerated to challenge Wariner for the pole position.  Warner held the pole, behind Soriano,  Ben Offereins was able to sneak Australia into third while Michael Bingham was being challenged by Piotr Klimczak for Poland.  Bingham was able to get around Thomas and then Soriano, putting Great Britain into a solid second place by the straightaway, but Wariner was running away from the pack.  Soriano paid for his exuberance and slowed down the home stretch as all the other teams passed him by the exchange.  Warner had opened up a 15-metre gap, the USA had completed their exchange before the other teams arrived.  Because of the change in positions, Bingham had to cross in front of several teams to make their exchange, and Kévin Borlée ran Belgium from last to fourth on the straight.  Kerron Clement for USA and far behind him Robert Tobin for Great Britain had clear sailing, behind them Australia and Belgium came out of the exchange best.  Tobin ran conservatively down the backstretch while Tristan Thomas accelerated to go around him on the turn.  Coming off the turn, Tobin regained second position and was gaining on Clement.  USA had new world champion LaShawn Merritt on the anchor he immediately started widening the gap on Martyn Rooney for Britain.  Australia's Sean Wroe had a significant gap on Belgium, while Yannick Fonsat brought France from dead last to almost even with Belgium at the exchange.  As Merritt kept widening the gap, Wroe was gaining on Rooney coming off the turn Wroe was perfectly positioned to punch for the silver medal position, but Rooney held him off, looking back to be sure he was holding clear.  USA finished with a 25-metre lead.

Medalists

* Runners who participated in the heats only and received medals.

Records

Prior to the competition, the following records were as follows.

No new world or championship record was set during this competition.

Qualification standards

Schedule

Results

Heats

Qualification: First 3 of each heat (Q) plus the 2 fastest times (q) advance to the final.

Key:  DQ = Disqualified, Q = qualification by place in heat, q = qualification by overall place, SB = Seasonal best

Final

Key:  SB = Seasonal best, WL = World leading (in a given season)

References
Men's 4 x 400 metres relay qualification from IAAF (Archived 2009-09-08). IAAF. Retrieved on 2009-08-27.
Men's 4 x 400 metres relay final results from IAAF. IAAF. Retrieved on 2009-08-27.

4x400
Relays at the World Athletics Championships